Griffith Anthony (1846 – 13 June 1897) was a musician.  He was born in Llanelly, Carmarthenshire, South Wales and worked at a Cwmbwrla's ironworks as a boy. He studied a form of sight-singing called tonic sol-fa and then began to teach music in churches. Among the songs, hymn tunes, and anthems that he wrote was Dyddiau dyn sydd fel glaswelltyn (Man, his days are as grass). He was with Babell Chapel of Cwmbwrla when he died 13 June 1897.

References 

Welsh educators
Welsh composers
Welsh male composers
1846 births
1897 deaths
19th-century Welsh educators
19th-century Welsh musicians
19th-century British composers
19th-century British male musicians